Niederwald may refer to:

 Niederwald, Texas, U.S.A
 Niederwald, Switzerland, in the canton of Valais
 Niederwald is the name of the hill in Germany where the Niederwalddenkmal is located
 Niederwald is the German word for coppice